Jean-Louis Leduc (7 March 1918 – 22 August 1993) was a Liberal party member of the House of Commons of Canada.  He was born in Sainte-Victoire-de-Sorel, Quebec and became a professor and businessman by career.

He represented Quebec's Richelieu electoral district since winning that seat in the 1979 federal election. He was re-elected in the 1980 election, but left national politics after his defeat to Louis Plamondon of the Progressive Conservative party in the 1984 federal election.

External links
 

1918 births
1993 deaths
Members of the House of Commons of Canada from Quebec
Liberal Party of Canada MPs